Terry Jenkins (born 26 September 1963) is an English former professional darts player who was nicknamed The Bull, having previously used the name "Tucker" for his matches. He reached number three in the world rankings and was a runner-up in nine major PDC televised finals, those being the 2006 and 2007 World Grand Prix, 2007 Premier League, 2007 Las Vegas Desert Classic, 2007 and 2009 World Matchplay, 2008 Grand Slam of Darts, 2014 UK Open and 2014 European Championship.

Darts career
It is a common myth that Jenkins is one of only a few people to exclusively play in the Professional Darts Corporation (PDC) when, in fact, Jenkins played in the British Darts Organisation (BDO) before, playing various opens from the early 1990s, and even reaching the quarter finals of the World Masters in 2003. Jenkins began to climb up the Professional Darts Corporation world rankings during 2005 by producing good performances in the tour events, which are played away from the television cameras. He won the Primus Masters in 2005 and added the Antwerp Open and the Open Hotel Zwartwater titles in 2006. Jenkins also played in several BDO events in the early stages of his career, including the Winmau World Masters where he once eliminated Tony O'Shea in the non-televised stages of the tournament. He is also often in attendance for the BDO World Championship, although he has never played in the competition.

In October 2006, he started to reproduce this form in front of the cameras by reaching the quarter finals of the 2006 Las Vegas Desert Classic and the final of the 2006 World Grand Prix in Dublin, Ireland. Despite losing the final to Phil Taylor, he had just managed to achieve enough ranking points to reach sixth place in the world rankings and secured a place in the lucrative 2007 Premier League.

2007
Terry qualified for the semi finals of the 2007 Premier League Darts and beat world champion Raymond van Barneveld in the semi-final. He lost to Phil Taylor in the final but he received his biggest career cheque of £40,000 for his run. It was around this time that he started to become a crowd favourite. He continued to perform well away from the cameras by winning two PDPA Players Championships in 2007 - the Antwerp Darts Trophy in April (along with a successful defence of his Antwerp Darts Open the same weekend) and the Isle Wight Players Championship at Hayling Island. He also reached the final of the Las Vegas Players Championship, losing to Raymond van Barneveld. Then less than a week later he lost heavily to Raymond in the Final of the Las Vegas Desert Classic 13–6 in legs. Terry's good form continued into the World Matchplay where he reached the final after beating Taylor in a superb display of clinical finishing. Terry also played well after failing to hit a perfect 9 darter after missing treble 19 for double 12 during the closing stages of the match. After beating Taylor in the semi-finals, Jenkins lost at the final hurdle to James Wade, in an 18–7 thrashing. He was also chosen to play in the Grand Slam of Darts  where he lost in the quarter finals to Andy Hamilton.

2008
Jenkins lost to Shepherd in the first round of the 2008 PDC World Championship, a result which saw him lose confidence which saw his best form desert him on occasions. He finished 7th in the 2008 Premier League Darts and then suffered a number of early round exits in major tournaments. To add to his poor run of form, Jenkins was knocked out in the first round of the 2008 European Championship Darts, by Carlos Rodriguez of Spain, who was then ranked 91 in the world. Despite not having a great year, Jenkins remained at No. 5 in the world. Jenkins had a good tournament at the 2008 Grand Slam of Darts reaching the final of the event before losing 18–9 to Taylor.

2009
2009 was a good year for Jenkins. He started the year winning the Bobby Bourn Memorial Players Championship. Despite not making the top 4 in the 2009 Premier League Darts, he made the quarter finals of both the 2009 Las Vegas Desert Classic and 2009 UK Open Darts. His best performance of the season came at the 2009 World Matchplay Darts where he lost in the final to Phil Taylor. As a result, Jenkins' entry into the 2010 Premier League Darts was guaranteed. Jenkins' good form continued in the 2009 World Grand Prix Darts, reaching the semi final, losing again to Taylor. He got through to the semi-finals of the 2009 Grand Slam of Darts following a sensational 10–9 win over James Wade in the 2nd round and then defeated Robert Thornton in the quarter-finals before he was beaten in the semis by Scott Waites.

2010
Jenkins made the third round of the 2010 PDC World Darts Championship, beating Paul Nicholson 3–2 in the first round, Darin Young 4–0 in the second round, before losing to Simon Whitlock 4–2 in the third round. He made the second round of the 2010 Players Championship Finals where he gave Phil Taylor an almighty scare but narrowly lost a terrific match 8–7. However, the 2010 Premier League Darts was the worst of his career so far with Jenkins finishing in last place. His performances in floor tournaments have been less than impressive, having lost several early round matches to relatively unknown players. Jenkins's poor form continued into the 2010 World Matchplay Darts with a 10–6 first round defeat to Steve Brown, who was ranked No 49 in the Order of Merit at the start of the match. The defeat saw Sky Sports' pundit Rod Harrington heavily criticise Jenkins live on air for being a lazy exhibition player, comments Harrington had been making throughout the Premier League campaign, despite the fact that Jenkins was the third highest prize money earner in 2009. Jenkins reaction to those comments saw him reach the semi final of the 2010 European Championship Darts, losing narrowly again to Phil Taylor in a classic 11–10, but showing a welcome return to form. Jenkins had a decent 2010 Grand Slam of Darts, beating Tony O'Shea in the 2nd round before succumbing to a final leg decider to James Wade. Following his Grand Slam of Darts quarter final defeat to Wade, Jenkins said in an interview that he believed players raise their game when they play him, as an example, Raymond van Barneveld struggled for form during the Premier League campaign, but managed to beat Jenkins twice and hit a nine darter against him.

2011
Terry Jenkins made a nervy start to the 2011 World Championship, narrowly beating Bradford born Joe Cullen in the first round 3 sets to 2. He initially led 2–0 and 1–0 in the third set against the darts before Cullen won 6 of the next 9 legs. Jenkins then beat Steve Brown 4–1 and followed this with a very convincing 4–0 victory over Mark Walsh. Reaching the quarter finals of the tournament Jenkins beat Wes Newton completing his first televised 170 checkout in the process to progress to the semi finals. He ended the tournament at the semi-final stage with a 6–2 loss to Gary Anderson. Following this Terry qualified as a wildcard for the 888.com Premier League Darts and opened his Premier League campaign with an 8–6 victory over Raymond van Barneveld. In week 2 he lost to Gary Anderson 8–4 throwing just over a 91 average, with Gary throwing a 102.21 average. In week 3 he lost to Phil Taylor while throwing a poor average of 85.61. He continued his poor form in an 8–1 defeat to Simon Whitlock in the fourth week of the 2011 Premier League of Darts.
In the fifth week Terry Jenkins won against The Welshman Mark Webster 8–4. Then in week six The Bull lost narrowly to The Machine James Wade 8–6. Then in week seven Terry performed well against the world champion Adrian Lewis the final result was 7–7 the first draw of the 2011 premier league. In week seven in Cardiff Terry Jenkins lost to the Aussie Simon Whitlock 8–3 but The Bull hit four 180's he's currently sixth in the 888poker.com darts premier league. In week eight in Aberdeen Terry lost to Gary Anderson 8–3. Terry went out in the first round of the 2011 World Matchplay to Steve Beaton losing 3–10. In the 2011 European Championship Jenkins beat Mark Webster 6–4 in the first round of the competition but lost against Paul Nicholson in the second round 10–4.

2012
Jenkins dropped just two sets as he made it through to the quarter-finals of the 2012 World Championship, beating Joe Cullen, Co Stompé and Justin Pipe. He played defending champion Adrian Lewis in the last 8 and looked to be heading tamely for the exit as he went 3–0 down, with only 2 legs to his name. However, he managed to regain some form, as Lewis lost his, to level match at 3–3. The comeback could not be turned into a triumph though, as Lewis won 6 of the last 8 legs to end Jenkins' hopes of winning his first major title.

In May, Jenkins won his first tournament for three years at the seventh UK Open Qualifier of the season. He defeated Andy Hamilton 6–3 in the final. At the UK Open itself he reached the quarter-finals, where he lost 5–10 to Phil Taylor. Jenkins played in his third World Matchplay semi-final in July, following wins over Kim Huybrechts (11–9), Raymond van Barneveld (13–10) and Adrian Lewis (16–12). He faced James Wade and missed six darts at 15–15 to move a leg away from the final and instead he was beaten 15–17. Back to back first round defeats in major tournaments followed at the World Grand Prix and European Championship and Jenkins failed to qualify from his group at the Grand Slam of Darts as he only won one of his three games. After all 33 ProTour events of 2012 had been played, Jenkins was 13th on the Order of Merit, which qualified him for the Players Championship Finals where he faced Mervyn King in the first round. Jenkins missed three darts for the match in the deciding leg, as he lost 5–6.

2013
Jenkins defeated Steve Brown and John Part to ease into the last 16 of the 2013 World Championship, where he faced Andy Hamilton. Jenkins won the first set but went on to lose 4–1, despite hitting 13 180's and averaging 100.39. He dropped to world number 16 after the tournament. Jenkins qualified for the UK Open by finishing 16th on the Order of Merit. He enjoyed wins over Jim Walker (9–7) and Kim Huybrechts (9–6) to play world number two Michael van Gerwen in the last 16. Jenkins lost the first six legs of the match and was beaten 9–3. He thrashed Andy Smith 10–3 at the World Matchplay to face Taylor in round two. The last player to beat Taylor in the tournament was Jenkins in 2007 and he almost did so again as from 9–5 down he rallied to lead 10–9 and 11–10, before being edged out 14–12.
Jenkins finished top of group 4 in the Championship League having won six of his seven games and then beat Gary Anderson 6–1 in the semi-finals and Michael van Gerwen 6–5 in the final despite the Dutchman hitting a nine darter. However, in the Winners Group he could only win one match to finish bottom of the table.

2014
Jenkins twice fought back from a set down in the first round of the 2014 World Championship against Per Laursen to level the game and then threw a nine-dart finish in the second leg of the decider. At two legs all Jenkins missed two darts to break throw and then missed another three in the next leg as Laursen hit double nine to eliminate him. Jenkins became the sixth player to throw a nine darter in the history of the event and also took out a 170 finish during the match.

In March, Jenkins reached his eighth major PDC final at the UK Open. He beat James Wade 9–8 in the last 16, Brendan Dolan 10–4 in the quarter-finals, and sensationally beat world number one and world champion Michael van Gerwen 10–8 in the semi-finals. He was beaten 11–1 by Adrian Lewis (who averaged over 109) in the final. His run earned him £25,000 and secured his place in the top 20 on the PDC Order of Merit. Jenkins averaged 105.85 against Robert Thornton in the final of the eighth Players Championship, but was defeated 6–4. He won his first ranking title in two years at the 10th event by beating Stephen Bunting 6–3 in the final. Jenkins' second major final of the year came at the European Championship where he lost 11–4 to Van Gerwen, meaning he has now reached nine major finals without being crowned the champion. At the Players Championship Finals he knocked out Van Gerwen for the second time in a major event this season with a 10–7 success, but Wes Newton defeated Jenkins 10–5 in the quarter-finals.

2015
From level at 1–1 against Michael van Gerwen in the third round of the 2015 World Championship, Jenkins lost a trio of sets in deciding legs to be defeated 4–1. In the Masters, he advanced to the quarter-finals after beating Phil Taylor 10–7 in his first-round game, but then lost 10–3 to Raymond van Barneveld. Jenkins reached his first European Tour final at the Gibraltar Darts Trophy by eliminating reigning champion James Wade 6–2, but would lose 6–3 to Van Gerwen. He let a 5–2 lead over Mensur Suljović turn into an 11–9 loss in the first round of the World Matchplay. In September, on his 52nd birthday, Jenkins won his first title of the year at the 15th Players Championship by beating Peter Wright 6–4 with an average of 108.02. He qualified for the first World Series of Darts Finals and a pair of 6–5 victories over Chris Dobey and Gary Anderson saw him reach the quarter-finals, where he lost 10–6 to Adrian Lewis.

2016
Jenkins could only win four legs in his second round match with Mark Webster at the 2016 World Championship in a 4–0 loss. He was beaten 9–5 by Peter Wright in the fourth round of the UK Open and 11–5 by Gary Anderson in the second round of the World Matchplay. Jenkins also met Anderson in the final of the 12th Players Championship and he was edged out 6–5. His first round match with James Wade at the World Grand Prix went to a deciding leg which Jenkins won, before losing 3–1 to Benito van de Pas in the second round.

2017
Jenkins announced that after the 2017 World Championship he would be semi-retiring from the PDC circuit, as travelling for the events like those on the European Tour was taking its toll on him and would instead do more exhibitions and practice sessions, as well as continuing his love of buying and selling antiques. In the second round he recovered from 3–1 down to Benito van de Pas to level at 3–3 and then missed one match dart at double 20 to seal the comeback win and was defeated 4–3. As a result of playing fewer tournaments, Jenkins did not qualify for the 2018 World Championship.

As of November 2018, Jenkins has not participated in any professional darts tournament.

World Championship performances
Jenkins made his PDC World Darts Championship debut in 2005, losing his opening game to Ronnie Baxter. In 2006, he was seeded 15 and won his first match against Jimmy Mann before falling in the last 32 to Andy Hamilton, who also ended Jenkins hopes in the 2007 World Championship, this time at the quarter-final stage by 5 sets to 4. In 2008, Jenkins fell at the first hurdle to 21-year-old qualifier Kirk Shepherd who went on to reach the final of the competition (losing to John Part). Jenkins had led 2–1 in sets and had seven darts to win the match in the fourth set, but missed all of them. Jenkins suffered a second successive first round exit in the 2009 World Championship, losing to another qualifier in Dennis Smith. Jenkins managed to break his Alexandra Palace hoodoo (which included becoming the first player to ever be whitewashed in the 2007 Premier League Darts by Colin Lloyd), in the 2010 PDC World Championship by beating Paul Nicholson 3–2 in a tense affair. He then beat Darin Young in the 2nd round 4–0 before losing to eventual runner-up Simon Whitlock 4–2 in the 3rd round. In 2011, he made a tense start to his World Championship bid, beating Joe Cullen 3–2 in sets after winning the first 7 legs. He followed that up with a convincing 4–1 victory over Steve Brown. He went on to defeat Mark Walsh and Wes Newton before losing 6–2 to Gary Anderson in the semi-finals. Jenkins made the quarter-finals in 2012, where he lost 3–5 to Adrian Lewis.

World Championship results

PDC
2005: Third round (lost to Ronnie Baxter 2–4)
2006: Second round (lost to Andy Hamilton 1–4)
2007: Quarter-finals (lost to Andy Hamilton 4–5)
2008: First round (lost to Kirk Shepherd 2–3)
2009: First round (lost to Dennis Smith 1–3)
2010: Third round  (lost to Simon Whitlock 2–4)
2011: Semi-finals (lost to Gary Anderson 2–6)
2012: Quarter-finals (lost to Adrian Lewis 3–5)
2013: Third round (lost to Andy Hamilton 1–4)
2014: First round (lost to Per Laursen 2–3)
2015: Third round (lost to Michael van Gerwen 1–4)
2016: Second round (lost to Mark Webster 0–4)
2017: Second round (lost to Benito van de Pas 3–4)

WSDT
 2022: Semi-finals (lost to Martin Adams 2–4)
 2023: Second round (lost to Mark Dudbridge 1–3)

Career statistics

(W) Won; (F) finalist; (SF) semifinalist; (QF) quarterfinalist; (#R) rounds 6, 5, 4, 3, 2, 1; (RR) round-robin stage; (Prel.) Preliminary round; (DNQ) Did not qualify; (DNP) Did not participate; (NH) Not held

Performance timeline

PDC major finals: 9 (9 runners-up)

PDC European tour finals: (1 runner-up)

Nine-dart finishes

References

External links
 Profile and stats on Darts Database
 Terry Jenkins Fan Website

Living people
1963 births
English darts players
Professional Darts Corporation former tour card holders
People from Ledbury
Sportspeople from Herefordshire
British Darts Organisation players
PDC ranking title winners
Darts players who have thrown televised nine-dart games